Calephorus compressicornis (French: criquet des dunes) is a species of grasshopper in the tribe Calephorini found in Europe (France, Spain) and Africa.

Pierre André Latreille first described the species (as Acrydium compressicornis) in 1804. The type locality is the vicinity of Bordeaux, France.

References 

 Latreille. 1804. Hist. Nat. Crust. Ins. 12:155 as Acrydium compressicornis
 Walker, F. 1870. Catalogue of the Specimens of Dermaptera Saltatoria in the Collection of the British Museum 4:786 as Oxycoryphus compressicornis
 Bolívar, I. 1876. An. Soc. Espan. Hist. Nat. 5:312 as Oxycoryphus compressicornis
 Krauss. 1890. Verh. der Zoologisch-Botanischen Gesellsch. Wien 40:260  as Oxycoryphus compressicornis
 Navás. 1909. Bol. Soc. Arag. Cienc. Nat. 8:199 as Oxycoryphus compressicornis
 Kirby, W.F. 1910. A Synonymic Catalogue of Orthoptera (Orthoptera Saltatoria, Locustidae vel Acridiidae) 3(2):137
 Bruner, L. 1910. Reise in Ostafrika 2:631 as Oxycoryphus compressicornis
 Chopard. 1922. Faune de France 3:141 as Calephorus compressicornis
 Morales-Agacino. 1942. Publ. Serv. Lucha contra la Langosta 10:1-66
 Morales-Agacino. 1950. Eos 26:19
 Johnston, H.B. 1956. Annotated catalogue of African grasshoppers 591 as Calephorus compressicornis
 Dirsh. 1956. Trans. R. Entomol. Soc. London 108(7):223
 Dirsh. 1965. The African Genera of Acridoidea 497
 Johnston, H.B. 1968. Annotated catalogue of African grasshoppers Suppl:360
 Harz. 1975. Ser. Entomol. 11:1-939 >> Note: neotypes male and female
 COPR (Centre for Overseas Pest Research). 1982. The Locust and Grasshopper Agricultural Manual 509
 Herrera. 1982. Ser. Entomol. 22:91
 Gangwere & Llorente del Moral. 1992. Eos 68(1):82
 Bellmann & Luquet. 1995. Guide des sauterelles, grillons et criquets d'Europe occidentale 264 as Calephorus compressicornis
 Pardo, J. 1995. Anales de Biología 9:29 as Calephorus compressicornis
 Massa & Fontana. 1998. Boll. Mus. civ. St. nat. Verona 22:86
 unknown 1999. Matériaux Orthoptériques et Entomocénotiques 2:40 as Calephorus compressicornis
 unknown [Ed.]. 2001. La détermination des Orthoptères de France 52 as Calephorus compressicornis
 Voisin [Ed.]. 2003. Patrimoines Naturels 60:65 as Calephorus compressicornis
 Mestre & Chiffaud. 2006. Catalogue et atlas des acridiens d'Afrique de l'Ouest 85 as Calephorus compressicornis
 Usmani, M.K. 2008. Zootaxa 1946:31 as Calephorus compressicornis
 Massa. 2009. Jour. Orth. Res. 18(1):83 as Calephorus compressicornis
 unknown 2013. Matériaux Orthoptériques et Entomocénotiques 18:28 (Note: neotypes of Harz invalid according to ICZN articles 75.1, 75.2 and 75.3.6) as Calephorus compressicornis
 unknown & Morichon. 2015. Faune de France 97(1a,b):459, pl. XIVb (Note: neotypes invalid) as Calephorus compressicornis

External links 
 
  
 

Acrididae
Insects described in 1804
Orthoptera of Europe